Emilio Marcos  Des Palma Morella (born 7 January 1978) is an Argentine man who was the first documented person born on the continent of Antarctica.

Biography
His father, Captain Jorge Emilio Palma, was head of the Argentine Army detachment at the base. While ten people have been born in Antarctica since, Palma's birthplace remains the southernmost.

In late 1977, Silvia Morella de Palma, who was then seven months pregnant, was airlifted to Esperanza Base, in order to complete her pregnancy in the base. The airlift was a part of the Argentine solutions to the sovereignty dispute over territory in Antarctica. Emilio was automatically granted Argentine citizenship by the government since his parents were both Argentine citizens, and he was born in the claimed Argentine Antarctica. This is a sector of Antarctica claimed by Argentina as part of its national territory, although this claim is not internationally recognised and overlaps with British and Chilean claims.

He is featured in the Guinness Book of Records as the first person known to have been born on the continent.

Other births in Antarctica

Solveig Gunbjørg Jacobsen of Norway, born in the island territory of South Georgia on 8 October 1913, was the first person born and raised in the Antarctic (the world region south of the Antarctic Convergence). The first human born in the wider Antarctic region was the Australian James Kerguelen Robinson, born in the Kerguelen Islands on 11 March 1859.

See also
 Demographics of Antarctica
 Solveig Gunbjørg Jacobsen

Notes

References

1978 births
Living people
People from Argentine Antarctica